A Gigster's Life for Me is the second album recorded by Alan Price and The Electric Blues Company, following Covers (1994). It was recorded between July and August 1995 at Olympic Studios London and released as part of Sanctuary Records' Blues Masters Series in 1996.

Track listing
"Boom Boom Boom Boom" (John Lee Hooker) – 4:47
"Rockin' Pneumonia and the Boogie Woogie Flu" (Huey "Piano" Smith, John Vincent) – 3:32
"Rollin' Like a Pebble in the Sand" (Rudy Toombs) – 3:10
"I Put a Spell on You" (Screamin' Jay Hawkins) – 3:02
"Good Times/Bad Woman" (Peter Bardens, Bobby Tench) – 4:03
"Some Change" (Boz Scaggs) – 5:32
"Enough Is Enough" (Zoot Money) – 3:05
"Whatcha Gonna Do?" (Peter Green} – 4:44
"A Gigster's Life for Me" (Alan Price, Tench) – 4:37
"(I Got) Business With the Blues" (Mitchell, Money) – 4:08
"How You've Changed" (Price) – 5:16
"Old Love" (Eric Clapton, Robert Cray) – 7:16
"What Am I Living For?" (Art Harris, Fred Jay) – 5:19
"Say It Isn't True" (Jackson Browne) – 11:05

Personnel

Alan Price and The Electric Blues Company
 Alan Price – keyboards, vocals
 Bobby Tench – lead guitar, vocals
 Zoot Money – keyboards, vocals
 Pete Grant – bass
 Martin Wilde – drums

Technical
 Alan Price and The Electric Blues Company – producers
 Adam Brown, Lorraine Francis, Pete Lewis, Steve "Barney" Chase – engineers
 Mark Warner – assistant engineer

Re-issues
Sanctuary 81285 (2003)
Castle 36115 (2005)

Notes

1996 albums
Alan Price albums
Albums recorded at Olympic Sound Studios
Sanctuary Records albums